

The Sablatnig SF-2 was a reconnaissance seaplane produced in Germany during the First World War.

Development
A refined version of the Sablatnig SF-1, the SF-2 featured a new empennage and was fitted with a radio transmitter. The prototype (serial 580) had a smaller tail-fin and rudder than the SF-1, but production examples added a large ventral fin. Construction was of wood, skinned i fabric.

Operational history
Sablatnig delivered six aircraft (navy serials 580–585) between June and September 1916. These were followed by ten machines built under licence by LVG (serials 791–800) between October and December, and ten more built by LFG (serials 705–714) between April and May the following year. Although produced as a reconnaissance machine, in practice, they were widely used as trainers.

Specifications

Notes

References
 

 
 
 

1910s German military reconnaissance aircraft
Floatplanes
Sablatnig aircraft
Biplanes
Single-engined tractor aircraft
Aircraft first flown in 1916